Scary Scooby Funnies is a 30-minute Saturday morning animated package show produced by  Hanna-Barbera Productions and broadcast on ABC from October 20, 1984 to August 31, 1985.

Overview
The series consisted of repackaged reruns of Scooby-Doo and Scrappy-Doo shorts from The Richie Rich/Scooby-Doo Show (1980–1982). It was added to ABC's Saturday morning line-up following the cancellation of the short-lived animated series Wolf Rock TV.

A total of sixty 7-minute episodes were rebroadcast in 20 half-hour formats (three segments aired per show).

Voices
Don Messick – Scooby-Doo, Scrappy-Doo
Casey Kasem – Shaggy

See also
 List of Scooby-Doo media

References

External links
 
 

1984 American television series debuts
1985 American television series endings
1980s American animated television series
American children's animated comedy television series
American Broadcasting Company original programming
Scooby-Doo package shows and programming blocks
Television series by Hanna-Barbera